Kuyavian-Pomeranian Voivodeship is one of the 16 voivodeships (provinces) in Poland.
 Kuyavian-Pomeranian is one of 13 Polish constituency of the European Parliament.
 Kuyavian-Pomeranian Regional Assembly is the regional legislature of the voivodeship.